Kropp is a municipality in the district of Schleswig-Flensburg, in Schleswig-Holstein, Germany. It is situated approximately 13 km south of Schleswig.

Kropp is the seat of the Amt ("collective municipality") Kropp-Stapelholm.

References

Schleswig-Flensburg